The 2011 FIFA Beach Soccer World Cup was an international beach soccer tournament held in Ravenna, Italy from 1 September until 11 September 2011. The 16 national teams involved in the tournament were required to register a squad of 12 players; only players in these squads are eligible to take part in the tournament.

The squads were announced one week before the start of the World Cup on 25 August 2011. Overall, 192 players have travelled to Ravenna to play in the World Cup.

Group A

Italy
Coach:  Massimiliano Esposito

Iran
Coach:  Behzad Dadashzadeh

Senegal
Coach:  Amadou Diop

Switzerland
Coach:  Angelo Schirinzi

Group B

Argentina
Coach:   Hector Petrasso

El Salvador
Coach:  Rudis Gonzalez

Oman
Coach:  Talib Al Thanawi

Portugal
Coach:  Ze Miguel Mateus

Group C

Nigeria
Coach:  Audu Adamu

Russia
Coach:  Mikhail Likhachev

Tahiti
Coach:  Teva Zaveroni

Venezuela
Coach:  Roberto Cavallo

Group D

Brazil
Coach:  Alexandre Soares

Japan
Coach:  Ruy Ramos

Mexico
Coach:  Ramon Raya

Ukraine
Coach:  Sergiy Kucherenko

Statistics
Player Statistics

Average age of squads

References

Squads
Beach soccer tournament squads